The 2014–15 Ural season was the 2nd successive season that the club played in the Russian Premier League, the highest tier of association football in Russia, and 7th in total. Ural also took part in the Russian Cup.

Squad
As of 3 February 2015, according to the official RFPL website.

Out on loan

Transfers

Summer

In:

Out:

Winter

In:

Out:

Competitions

Russian Premier League

Results by round

Matches

League table

Relegation play-offs

Russian Cup

Squad statistics

Appearances and goals

|-
|colspan="14"|Players away from the club on loan:

|-
|colspan="14"|Players who appeared for Ural no longer at the club:

|}

Goal scorers

Disciplinary record

Notes 
 YEKT time changed from UTC+6 to UTC+5 permanently on 26 October 2014.

References

FC Ural Yekaterinburg seasons
Ural